The Women's over 70 kg judo competition at the 2004 Summer Paralympics was held on 20 September at the Ano Liossia Olympic Hall.

The tournament bracket consisted of a single-elimination contest culminating in a gold medal match and a single bronze medal bout.

The event was won by Xue Lan Mei, representing .

Results
The four digits represent scores of ippon, waza-ari, yuko and koka (which was still used at the time).

Competition bracket

References

External links
 

W71
Judo at the Summer Paralympics Women's Heavyweight
Paralympics W71